The Ten Commandments is a 1923 American silent religious epic film produced and directed by Cecil B. DeMille. Written by Jeanie MacPherson, the film is divided into two parts: a prologue recreating the biblical story of the Exodus and a modern story concerning two brothers and their respective views of the Ten Commandments.

Lauded for its "immense and stupendous" scenes, use of Technicolor process 2, and parting of the Red Sea sequence, the expensive film proved to be a box-office hit upon release. It is the first in DeMille's biblical trilogy, followed by The King of Kings (1927) and The Sign of the Cross (1932).

The Ten Commandments is one of many works from 1923 that entered the public domain in the United States in 2019.

Plot

The film is divided into two parts: the Prologue, which consists of the epic tale of Moses, and the Story, set in a modern setting and involving living by the lessons of the commandments.

The prologue
The opening statement explains that modern society mocked and laughed at Judeo-Christian morality until it witnessed the horrors of World War I; it then beseeches the viewer to turn back to the Ten Commandments, describing them as "the fundamental principles without which mankind cannot live together. They are not laws—they are the LAW." From there, the Book of Exodus is recounted, starting from just after the ninth plague.  

After their flight from Egypt, and the Crossing of the Red Sea, Moses climbs Mount Sinai, where he witnesses the ten commandments given as writing in the sky, and which he then manually carves into stone tablets. When he returns, he finds that the Israelites have fallen into debauchery and built a golden calf to worship. Furiously, he smashes the commandments, deeming the Israelites unworthy. An Israelite man and woman seducing each other find, to the horror of both, that the woman has hideous sores covering her hands and is now unclean, prompting her to beg Moses to be cleansed. Moses calls on the power of God and the calf is destroyed with lightning.

The story
Two brothers, John and Dan McTavish, live with their mother Martha, a believer in Biblical inerrancy. The two brothers make opposite decisions; John follows his mother's teaching of the Ten Commandments and becomes a carpenter living on meager earnings, and Dan, now an avowed atheist who is convinced that the Commandments never offer him anything, vows to break every one of them and rise to the top.

Martha evicts Dan from her house. He stops for a bite to eat at a lunch wagon. There, Mary, an impoverished but beautiful young woman, steals a bite of Dan's sandwich and triggers a madcap chase after her. She takes refuge in the McTavish house, where John convinces his mother to take Mary in for the night. John also convinces Dan to set aside his grievance and stay; he also introduces Dan to Mary. Dan quickly wins Mary over with his freewheeling ways. Martha's strict observance of the Sabbath causes friction when Dan and Mary begin dancing on a Sunday, and, although John tries to convince his mother to show grace, Dan and Mary decide it is time to run off together.

Three years later, Dan has become a corrupt contractor. He earns a contract to build a massive cathedral and decides to cut the amount of cement in the concrete to dangerously low levels, pocketing the money saved and becoming very rich. He puts John, still a bachelor, in charge of construction, hoping to use him as a conduit to provide the gifts to their mother that she refuses to accept from Dan. Dan cheats on Mary with Sally, a Eurasian adulteress. One day, Martha comes to visit John at his work site; a wall collapses on her. Fatally injured, with her last words, she tells Dan that she spent too much time trying to teach him to fear God and not enough time on God's love.

Now out of money, Dan learns that a muckraker tabloid has threatened to expose his operation. His business partner recommends a $25,000 bribe to stop publication, but lacking the funds, Dan instead attempts suicide – his partner stops the attempt, solely because he refuses to take the fall alone, and demands the money. He goes to Sally's brothel to take back a set of expensive pearls he gave her, but Sally refuses and reveals herself to have smuggled herself into the country from Molokai through a contraband jute shipment and is thus infected with leprosy, thus likely infecting Dan as well. In a rage, he kills Sally and attempts to flee to Mexico on a motorboat (the S.S. Defiance), but rough weather sends him off course and he crashes into a rocky island. His dead body is seen among the wreckage. Mary, fearing herself also infected, stops by John's office to say goodbye, but John insists on taking her in. As he reads Mary the New Testament story of Jesus healing the lepers (re-enacted on screen, with Jesus shown only from behind), a light shows Mary's hands not to be scarred at all, and that her perceived scars had disappeared in the light – a metaphor for the healing salvation of Christ.

Throughout the film, the visual motif of the tablets of the commandments appears in the sets, with a particular commandment appearing on them when it is relevant to the story.

Cast

Prologue
 Theodore Roberts as Moses, The Lawgiver 
 Charles De Roche as Rameses, The Magnificent
 Estelle Taylor as Miriam, The Sister of Moses 
 Julia Faye as The Wife of Pharaoh
 Pat Moore (billed as Terrence Moore) as The Son of Pharaoh
 James Neill as Aaron, Brother of Moses 
 Lawson Butt as Dathan, The Discontented 
 Clarence Burton as The Taskmaster
 Noble Johnson as The Bronze Man

Story
 Edythe Chapman as Mrs. Martha McTavish
 Richard Dix as John McTavish, her son
 Rod La Rocque as Dan McTavish, her son
 Leatrice Joy as Mary Leigh
 Nita Naldi as Sally Lung, a Eurasian
 Robert Edeson as Redding, an Inspector
 Charles Ogle as The Doctor
 Agnes Ayres as The Outcast

Production
The idea for the film was based upon the winning submission to a contest in which the public suggested ideas for DeMille's next film. The winner was F. C. Nelson of Lansing, Michigan; the first line of his suggestion read: "You cannot break the Ten Commandments—they will break you." Production on the film started on May 21, 1923, and ended on August 16, 1923.

Writing

Jeanie MacPherson, the film's screenwriter, first thought to "interpret the Commandments in episodic form". Both she and DeMille eventually decided on an unusual two-part screenplay: a biblical prologue and a modern story demonstrating the consequences of breaking the Ten Commandments. In a treatment for the film, MacPherson described the four main characters of the modern story:

Filming

The Exodus scenes were filmed at the Guadalupe-Nipomo Dunes in northern Santa Barbara County. The film location was originally chosen because its immense sand dunes provided a superficial resemblance to the Egyptian desert. Rumor had it that after the filming was complete, the massive sets – which included four  Pharaoh statues, 21 sphinxes, and gates reaching a height of 110 feet, which were built by a small army of 1,600 workers – were dynamited and buried in the sand. Instead, the wind, rain and sand at the Guadalupe-Nipomo Dunes likely collapsed and buried a large part of the set under the ever-shifting dunes. The statues and sphinxes are in roughly the same place they were during filming. In 2012, archaeologists uncovered the head of one of the prop sphinxes; a 2014 recovery effort showed the body of that sphinx to have deteriorated significantly, but a second better-preserved sphinx was discovered and excavated. The effort to locate and excavate the set was the subject of a 2016 documentary, The Lost City of Cecil B. DeMille.

The parting of the Red Sea scene was shot in Seal Beach, California. The visual effect of keeping the walls of water apart while the Israelites walked through was accomplished with a slab of Jell-O that was sliced in two and filmed close up as it jiggled. This shot was then combined with live-action footage of Israelites walking into the distance to create the illusion.

Portions of the modern story were filmed in San Francisco, with the cathedral building sequence filmed at the then under construction Sts. Peter and Paul Church on Filbert Street and the adjoining Washington Square.

Release
Distributed by Paramount Pictures, The Ten Commandments premiered at Grauman's Egyptian Theatre (in Hollywood) on December 4, 1923.

Critical response

On its release, critics praised The Ten Commandments overall; however, the part of the film set in modern times received mixed reviews. Variety, for example, declared the opening scenes alone worth the admission price, but found the remainder of the film disappointing by comparison:  "The opening Biblical scenes of The Ten Commandments are irresistible in their assembly, breadth, color and direction [...] They are immense and stupendous, so big the modern tale after that seems puny."

According to the review aggregator website Rotten Tomatoes, 83% of critics have given the film a positive review based on 6 reviews, with an average rating of 6.7/10.

Box office
The Ten Commandments became the highest-grossing film of 1923. The film's box-office returns held the Paramount revenue record for 25 years until it was broken by other DeMille films. The film competed at the box office with Fox's The Shepherd King, and won out overall.

Ban in China
The movie was banned in the 1930s in China under a category of "superstitious films" due to its religious subject matter involving gods and deities.

Remake

DeMille directed a second, expanded version of the biblical story in 1956. For the later version, DeMille dropped the modern-day storyline in favor of profiling more of Moses' early life. In 2006, the 1923 film was released on DVD as an extra feature on the 50th Anniversary DVD release of the 1956 film. In the DVD commentary with Katherine Orrison included with the 1923 film, she states that DeMille refilmed several sequences nearly shot-for-shot for the new version, and also had set pieces constructed for the later film that were near-duplicates of what he had used in 1923. On March 29, 2011, Paramount released a new Blu-ray Disc with the 6-disc box set.

See also
 List of early color feature films
 List of films featuring slavery
 False protagonist
The House That Shadows Built, 1931 promotional film by Paramount 
Sands of Oblivion, Sci-Fi Channel movie centered around a haunted artifact from the 1923 film

References

External links

 
 
 
 
 The Ten Commandments at Virtual History
 Peter Brosnan Papers, MSS 5905 at L. Tom Perry Special Collections, Brigham Young University

1923 films
1920s color films
1923 drama films
Silent American drama films
American epic films
American silent feature films
American black-and-white films
Articles containing video clips
Famous Players-Lasky films
Films based on the Book of Exodus
Films about Jews and Judaism
Films about Christianity
Films directed by Cecil B. DeMille
Films set in ancient Egypt
Films set in the 13th century BC
Films shot in California
Films shot in Los Angeles
Films shot in San Francisco
Religious epic films
Silent films in color
Surviving American silent films
Ten Commandments
Portrayals of Moses in film
Cultural depictions of Ramesses II
Cultural depictions of Nefertari
Works banned in China
Censored films
Paramount Pictures films
Religious controversies in film
1920s American films
Silent adventure films